Fontaine Bluff is a bluff  west of Cape Murray on the south side of Carlyon Glacier in Antarctica. It was mapped by the United States Geological Survey from tellurometer surveys and Navy air photos, 1959–63, and was named by the Advisory Committee on Antarctic Names for Lieutenant Commander R.K. Fontaine, U.S. Navy, commander of USS Hissem on ocean station duty in support of aircraft flights between Christchurch and McMurdo Sound, 1963–64.

References 

Cliffs of Oates Land